Alden Anderson (October 11, 1867 – September 23, 1944) was a Republican politician from California.

He served as the Lieutenant Governor of California from 1903 to 1907. Prior to that he had been a member of the California State Assembly representing Solano County, and served as its Speaker from January 1899 to February 1900.

Although Anderson's father had first migrated to California from Pennsylvania shortly after the California Gold Rush in 1852, Anderson was born in Crawford County, Pennsylvania in 1867. His family returned to California several months later and settled in San Jose.

Anderson attended the University of the Pacific and afterward worked in his father's fruit packing business, before starting his own fruit business in Suisun City in Solano County. He went on to represent Solano County in the 1897 and 1901 sessions of the Legislature. Anderson moved to Sacramento in 1902, where he was a founder and president of the Capital National Bank.

Elected lieutenant governor in 1902, Anderson served for a single term under Governor George Pardee. He later served as state superintendent of banks from 1909 to 1910. Anderson ran for governor as a Republican in 1910 but was defeated in the primary by Hiram Johnson.

Anderson was the uncle of California Congressman Jack Z. Anderson.

Anderson died in 1944 at the age of 76. His remains are interred at East Lawn Memorial Park in Sacramento.

References

1867 births
1944 deaths
Lieutenant Governors of California
Speakers of the California State Assembly
Republican Party members of the California State Assembly
People from Solano County, California